Brójce may refer to:
Brójce, Łódź Voivodeship, Poland
Brójce, Lubusz Voivodeship, Poland